Russell Hitchcock is the self-titled debut solo album by Russell Hitchcock, best known as the lead singer of Air Supply, released in 1988. The album did not reach the charts, though singles "Someone Who Believes in You", "I Can't Believe My Eyes" and the covers "The Sun Ain't Gonna Shine Anymore", "What Becomes of the Brokenhearted" and "Where Did the Feeling Go?" had minor recognition.

As a solo artist, Hitchcock would later release several more singles, the most famous being "Swear to Your Heart" from the film Arachnophobia. Others include duets with Judith Durham from the I Am an Australian album, "De Todos Modos" with Ednita Nazario from the album Super Exitos (1991) and "Is It You" with Rita Coolidge (1995).

Also of note is the track "The River Cried", which was first recorded by former Scandal vocalist/songwriter Patty Smyth for her 1987 debut solo album (the version heard here is 12 seconds shorter).

Track listing 
"Someone Who Believes in You" (Gerry Goffin, Carole King) 4:12
"The Sun Ain't Gonna Shine (Anymore)" (Bob Crewe, Bob Gaudio) 3:41
"What Becomes of the Brokenhearted" (James Dean, Paul Riser, William Weatherspoon) 3:38
"I Come Alive" (Albert Hammond, Randy Kerber) 3:42
"The River Cried" (Tom Kelly, Billy Steinberg) 4:04
"Dreams of the Lonely" (Myles Hunter) 4:54
"Best Intentions" (George Merrill, Shannon Rubicam) 4:28
"I Can't Believe My Eyes" (John Bettis, Jon Lind) 4:30
"Where Did the Feeling Go?" (Michael Masser, Norman Saleet) 3:46
"Make It Feel Like Home Again" (Tom Kelly, Billy Steinberg) 3:36

Personnel 
Michael Baird - drums
Dennis Belfield - bass
Susan Boyd - backing vocals 
Robbie Buchanan - keyboards
Rosemary Butler - backing vocals 
Denny Carmassi - drums
Peter Gifford - bass guitar
Merry Clayton - backing vocals 
Jim Cox - synthesizer, keyboards
Bill Cuomo - bass, keyboards
Greg Ham - keyboards, backing vocals
Mike Curb - arranger
John d'Andrea - arranger
Michael Fisher - percussion
Randy Foote - backing vocals
Tommy Funderburk - backing vocals 
Claude Gaudette - synthesizer, arranger, keyboards
Jim Gilstrap - backing vocals 
Gary Herbig - tenor saxophone
Carroll Sue Hill - backing vocals 
Russell Hitchcock - vocals, backing vocals 
Mark Hudson - backing vocals
Dann Huff - guitar
Laurence Juber - guitar
Edie Lehmann - backing vocals 
Paul Leim - drums
Michael Lloyd - synthesizer, arranger, keyboards
Myrna Matthews - backing vocals
Alan Pasqua - keyboards
Eric Persing - synthesizer
Aaron Rapoport - photography
Neil Stubenhaus - bass
Owen Waters - backing vocals

Production
Producers: Robbie Buchanan, Mike Curb, Jimmy Ienner, Michael Lloyd, Keith Olsen; assisted by Dan Nebenzal
Recording engineers: Brian Foraker, Michael Lloyd, Jack Joseph Puig; assisted by Dan Nebenzal 
Mixing: Brian Foraker, Carmine Rubino
Remixing: Jeremy Smith & Frank Wolf

Additional credits
Art direction: Maude Gilman

References

1988 debut albums
Albums produced by Keith Olsen
Albums produced by Jimmy Ienner
Arista Records albums
Russell Hitchcock albums
Albums produced by Mike Curb